Viburnum × carlcephalum, common name fragrant snowball, is a hybrid flowering plant in the family Adoxaceae (formerly Caprifoliaceae), of garden origin. It is a cross between V. carlesii and V. macrocephalum.

Rounded flower-heads composed of many fragrant, tubular white flowers are borne in early summer. Flowering is later than many other deciduous viburnums. The flowers are followed in autumn by insignificant red-black fruits.

This plant has gained the Royal Horticultural Society's Award of Garden Merit.

References

carlcephalum
Plant nothospecies